The APEC Climate Center (APCC) is a governmental institution that conducts research in climate prediction, analysis and climate change application areas. It also provides climate information services and capacity building programs with the aim of strengthening scientific and technological cooperation across the APEC region. APCC was established in the APEC Senior Officials' Meeting held in November 2005. It was formally launched at the APEC Economic Leaders' Meeting in the same year. It is currently located in Busan, South Korea.

History 
The forerunner of the APEC Climate Center is the APEC Climate Network (APCN) established by the APEC Industrial Science and Technology Working Group (ISTWG). The Network was established with the aim of exchanging climate information among APEC economies in order to combat climate and weather related disasters. It was proposed during the 16th APEC ISTWG meeting in 1999 by the Korea Meteorological Administration and the network had its first working group meeting in May 2001.

The APCN was initiated to share reliable regional climate information among the economies. The effort was justified in terms of economic rationale. By sharing the information of individual national meteorological institutions, the institutions had received more accurate climate information through the Multi Model ensemble technique, which combine the diverse range of climate information submitted by the institutions to generate more accurate climate information. In order to further develop the technique and to help APEC member economies enhance their climate prediction capabilities through capacity building efforts, it was deemed necessary to create a formal institution. Thus through the discussions held in APEC Science and Technology Ministerial Meeting in 2004, the ISTWG Meeting in 2004 and the Senior Officials’ Meeting in 2005, the establishment of the Center was approved by APEC.

Activities

APEC Climate Symposium 
The APEC Climate Symposium (APCS) is the flagship international event organized by the Center as a forum for research exchange on climate science. It has been held annually since 2006, generally in the host cities of the year's APEC meetings.

Training Programme

Projects

See also 
 Asia-Pacific Economic Cooperation

References 

Asia-Pacific Economic Cooperation
Climate of Asia
International climate change organizations
Haeundae District